The Scunthorpe Alphas are an American football club based in Scunthorpe, North Lincolnshire, England that competes in the BAFA National Leagues NFC 1 Central, the second tier of British American football. The club play their home games at Quibell Park Stadium and were formed in late 2018 by a consortium of coaches and former players who had previously played together at other local sides. In formation the Alphas became the second American football team to represent Scunthorpe following the Steelers who folded in 1990. The Alphas were made full BAFA members in October 2020 and will play in Division Two for the 2022 season.

History
The Alphas were formed in 2018 by a consortium of coaches and former players who had previous links to the Sheffield Giants, Lincolnshire Bombers and Doncaster Mustangs, namely founding members Warwick Grosvenor, Alex Robson, Nick Tomaszewski, Mikey Gray and Iain Heron Stamp.

The club had become the first team to represent Scunthorpe since the 'Scunthorpe Steelers' who folded in 1990. The Alphas added American quarterback Derek Yenerall, formerly of Premier League team Bristol Aztecs to their roster for their debut season and played their first game against Etone Jaguars (formerly Coventry Jets) on the 3 August 2019, losing 16–12 in Nuneaton. The Alphas brought American Football back to Quibell Park Stadium for the first time in 19 years when they hosted the Northants Knights on 15 September 2019, in attendance was a crowd of over 400 people.

In February 2020 in preparation for their second season, the Alphas appointed former NCAA LSU Tigers player William Walker Jnr as their new Offensive Line coach. Walker had played under Louis Oubre at McDonogh High School and alongside future NFL players Joe McKnight and Delvin Breaux.

The Alphas were made full BAFA members in October 2020 and will play in Division Two for the 2021 season. BAFA representative Warren Smart commented "BAFA believes that General Manager (GM) Warwick Grosvenor, aided by Assistant GM Nick Tomaszewski and the Alphas management and coaching squad, has established a sustainable, dynamic and competitive club".

The Alphas made their debut in part of the make-shift 2021 season, with BAFA announcing that the three-tier format would be suspended for one season and replaced by a localised division in order to minimize travel. Scunthorpe were placed in the BAFA Central East with the Nottingham Caesars, Lincolnshire Bombers, Northants Knights and South Lincs Lightning. The Alphas won their debut BAFANL game with a 10–3 victory over the Lincolnshire Bombers with Deivydas Merkelis scoring Scunthorpe's first ever League touchdown.

Youth Team
The Alphas introduced several levels of Youth team football in 2020 and in turn appointed former Great Britain Lions youth coach Richard Scott as their new U19 Head Coach. The Alphas will also run a U16 team with coaches Ryan McEntee and Patrick Galvin on board to work under coach Scott.

In 2022, Scunthorpe Alphas saw the selection of 2 members of the Scunthorpe Alphas selected to represent the Great Britain U17s Team in LT Dominic Norbron and WR Jay Robinson.

Stadium

The Alphas play their home games at Quibell Park Stadium, the former home of the Steelers. Quibell Park is a purpose-built athletics and cycling velodrome stadium that has an American football field in the centre. The Alphas also use the adjacent field for practice making the Quibell Park complex their home for both training and match day.

Coaching staff

Roster

Season records

Honours
BAFA National Leagues : NFC 2 South Champions - 2022

References

External links
Scunthorpe Alphas Official Website

BAFA National League teams
American football teams in England
2018 establishments in England
American football teams established in 2018
Sport in Scunthorpe